The Philippine Student Alliance Lay Movement Inc. (Abbreviated P.S.A.L.M) is an organized para-church ministry incorporated under the Christian and Missionary Alliance Churches of the Philippines, Inc. It is an interdenominational campus ministry that provides evangelistic programs and enhances leadership skills among young people.

History

PSALM began as College Youth Center (CYC), founded by Dr. Joseph Arthur on August 8, 1969 in Zamboanga City, Philippines. 

Later on February 22, 1977, the ministry became a movement and was incorporated under the name Philippine Student Alliance Lay Movement, Inc. (PSALM).

As of 2009, PSALM has 21 recognized districts all over the Philippines.

See also

Alliance Youth Philippines
CAMACOP

External links
http://psalm.org.ph/ Official Website]

Evangelicalism in the Philippines
Youth organizations based in the Philippines
Christian and Missionary Alliance
Student organizations established in 1969
Religious organizations based in the Philippines